Baba Baby O is a 2022 Indian Bengali-language drama film directed by Aritra Mukherjee. The film is produced by Shiboprosad Mukherjee and Nandita Roy under the banner of Windows Production. The film stars Jisshu Sengupta and Solanki Roy in lead roles.

Plot

40-something Megh decides to have babies through surrogacy. His life takes a u-turn when he meets Brishti. The film tries to highlight that love can happen anywhere, anytime.

The film begins with Megh becoming a father through surrogacy to two little boys (later referred to as Potol-Posto). Due to his constant denial and disinterest in marriage, his father comes to doubt if he is gay and in a relationship with his best friend. However he reveals that his disinterest is not only due to his age but also due to rejection he faced from his former girlfriend due to his love and desire for children.

Megh goes to a toy shop to buy toys for his boys, sees Brishti scolding a man for his indecent comments. Megh, as his caring nature suggests, rescues Brishti from the ruckus, also having developed a crush on her. Through numerous encounters henceforth, he helps Brishti in various ways. It is eventually revealed that Brishti has a sour relationship with her mother due to her second marriage as she believes her mother dumped her father, while it is the vice versa. It is also revealed that she hates kids as she believes they are irrational and impractical unlike adults which breaks Megh's heart. Enter Souvik, Brishti's boyfriend, who plans to shift to Sydney with Brishti and sell the house and toy shop that Brishti and her mother have inherited from the latter's second marriage. This makes Brishti's mother furious and Brishti leaves the house with Souvik. Brishti seeks help from Megh and he finds them an apartment beside his own flat for rent. A beautiful relationship develops between Megh's parents, Brishti and Megh's children, whom Brishti begins to accept.

We see the constant neglect that Souvik offers in the relationship to Brishti, not being there when she needs him the most, unlike Megh, who always open heartedly tries to hear Brishti out. Brishti finds a letter in her luggage which was written by her biological father to her mother before she got married for the second time, stating that he has happily settled again and Brishti must not know of how he has dumped her. Brishti regrets not accepting her adoptive father and her mother's marriage when her adoptive father was actually alive. She tries to contact Souvik who is out of the house, but not getting any support from him, calls Megh instead. Megh consoles her. Brishi reconciles with her mother.

Some days later, as Brishti is about to leave for sydney with souvik, her mother shows her a picture of Megh and approves him over Souvik, as he kept sending Brishti's pictures to her mother all the while that she was away.

Brishti and Souvik have lunch at Megh's place and Brishti leaves for sydney with a heavy heart. Megh realises how important Brishti is to him and goes to stop her when his parents motivate him, however in vain. He returns home only to find Brishti waiting for him. From here onwards the director's open end trick works. It is shown that Megh imagines himself having a conversation with Brishti after entering the room. She tells him that she was always confused if Megh was her father or her lover due to his fatherly nature, hinting of the void of the fatherly love that she had always craved for. Megh assures her that she is free to love him in whatever way. Brishti says she might not be a good mother to Potol Posto but can be a good friend to them. Megh tells her that every kind of love has an affection and she is free to mould their children in any way she wants. Megh and Brishti reconcile, a happy family scene is shown, hinting at their marriage and love filled life with a sense of freedom ahead. But the moment Megh is back and another Megh is portrayed imagining the entire thing with all the other cast ignoring Megh to be back signifies that Brishti didn't return. The imagination of what could have happened if Brishti returns is what shown in the end. Many will be mistaken on this perspective and would consider this as a happy ending which is rather unrequited. One can think of all realistic possibilities to support the fact that Brishti is back but that won't be a justified one both in reality and technically. This film's climax is much more than just a happy ending. This is why this film stands out in a different way altogether. When all the 90s romantic film incidents are proven wrong in one way or the other in reality, the ending also somehow breaks the stereotype of typical happy ending of romantic films.

Cast

Soundtrack

The background score and the soundtracks are composed by Chamok Hasan, Amit-Ishan and lyrics are penned by Chamok Hasan, Ritam Sen and Firoza Bonhi

Release
The film released on 4 February 2022.

Reception

Accolades
 14th Jaipur International Film Festival (nominated)

References

External links
 

2022 films
Bengali-language Indian films
2020s Bengali-language films
Indian drama films
2022 drama films
Indian pregnancy films